Nangis is a commune in the Seine-et-Marne department in the Île-de-France region in north-central France. Nangis station has rail connections to Provins, Longueville and Paris.

Coat of arms
Azure with six argent roundels.

Demographics
The inhabitants are called the Nangissiens in French.

See also
 Château de Nangis
 Communes of the Seine-et-Marne department

References

External links

 Official website 
 1999 Land Use, from IAURIF (Institute for Urban Planning and Development of the Paris-Île-de-France région) 
 

Communes of Seine-et-Marne